Cape Brown is a headland in the Greenland Sea, east Greenland, Sermersooq municipality.

History
This headland was named "Cape Brown" by William Scoresby (1789 – 1857) in 1822 to honour Scottish botanist Robert Brown (1773–1858).

A small wintering station known as "Kap Brown Station" was built in 1934 on the eastern shore of nearby Fleming Fjord  SW of Cape Brown at the time of the Three-year Expedition to East Greenland. The names Vimmelskaftet and Flemmingfjordhuset were also used for the same station.

Geography
Cape Brown is located in the Greenland Sea south of Cape Biot, off the southern end of Davy Sound. 

Cape Brown is the northernmost point of the Wegener Peninsula in Jameson Land.

See also
Geography of Greenland

References

External links
 Greenland Pilot - Danish Geodata Agency 

Headlands of Greenland